The 1951–52 Boston Celtics season was the sixth season of the Boston Celtics in the National Basketball Association (NBA).

Draft picks

Roster

Pre-season

Regular season

Season standings

Record vs. opponents

Game log

Playoffs

|- align="center" bgcolor="#ccffcc"
| 1
| March 19
| New York
| W 105–94
| Bob Cousy (31)
| Bill Sharman (7)
| Boston Garden
| 1–0
|- align="center" bgcolor="#ffcccc"
| 2
| March 23
| @ New York
| L 97–101
| Ed Macauley (36)
| Bob Donham (9)
| Madison Square Garden III
| 1–1
|- align="center" bgcolor="#ffcccc"
| 3
| March 26
| New York
| L 87–88 (2OT)
| Bob Cousy (34)
| Bob Cousy (8)
| Boston Garden
| 1–2
|-

Player statistics

Season

Playoffs

Awards and records
Ed Macauley, All-NBA First Team
Bob Cousy, All-NBA First Team

Transactions

References

See also
1951–52 NBA season

Boston Celtics seasons
Boston Celtics
Boston Celtics
Boston Celtics
1950s in Boston